Yen Ho-shen (born 31 December 1990) is a Taiwanese footballer who currently plays as a centre back at the national and club level.

International goals
Scores and results are list Taiwan's goal tally first.

References

1990 births
Living people
Taiwanese footballers
Chinese Taipei international footballers
Taiwan Power Company F.C. players
Association football midfielders
People from Hualien County